Brachypterus schaefferi is a species of short-winged flower beetle in the family Kateretidae. It is found in North America.

References

Further reading

 

Kateretidae
Articles created by Qbugbot
Beetles described in 1912